is a mountain in Tenryū-ku, Hamamatsu (in the former town of Haruno), Shizuoka Prefecture, Japan. It is a peak on a southern spur of the Akaishi Mountains.

It is the location of the Akihasan Hongū Akiha Jinja shrine, dedicated to a god of fire. Belief in the Akiha kami as protectors against fire became widespread in the Edo period of Japanese history, leading to the popularity of pilgrimages to climb this mountain.

Akiha